Rose City Cemetery, also known as Rose City Cemetery and Funeral Home, is a cemetery in northeast Portland, Oregon's Cully neighborhood, in the United States.

History

Leaders of the Japanese Association, which became the Nikkei Jin Kai after World War II, purchased a large portion of the cemetery. In 2005, the Japanese Ancestral Society became the cemetery's title holder. The organization continues to administer an endowment to maintain the cemetery.

Notable burials
 Alaric B. Chapin (1848–1924), Civil War Medal of Honor recipient
 Richard E. Geis (1927–2013), writer
 Theodore Thurston Geer (1851–1924), Oregon Governor
 Don Johnson (1926–2015), MLB pitcher
 John Alphonsus Murphy (1881–1935), Boxer Rebellion Medal of Honor recipient
 A. W. Norblad (1881–1960), Oregon Governor
 Artie Wilson (1920–2010), MLB infielder

References

External links

 
 
 

Cemeteries in Portland, Oregon
Cully, Portland, Oregon